Topra, combined name for the larger Topra Kalan and adjacent smaller Topra Khurd,  is a Mauryan Empire-era village in Yamunanagar district of Haryana state in India.  
It lies 14 km west of Yamunanagar, 14 km from Radaur and 90 km from Chandigarh.

Topra Ashokan Pillar

Situated in Pong valley of is the original home of Delhi-Topra pillar (originally located at ),  one of many pillars of Ashoka, that was moved from Topra to Feroz Shah Kotla in Delhi in 1356 CE by Firuz Shah Tughlaq (1309-1388 CE).

The original inscription on the Delhi-Topra Ashokan obelisk is primarily in Brahmi script, but the language was Prakrit, with some Pali and Sanskrit added later. The inscription was successfully translated in 1837 by James Prinsep. This and other ancient lats (pillars, obelisk) have earned Feroz Shah Tughlaq and Delhi Sultanate fame for its architectural patronage.

The Sultanate had wanted to break and reuse the Ashokan pillar for a minaret. Feroz Shah Tuhglaq, however decided to erect it near the mosque instead. At the time of re-installation of the obelisk in Delhi, in 1356, no one knew the meaning of the script engraved in the stone.

About five hundred years later, the script (Brahmi) was deciphered by James Prinsep in 1837 with help from scripts discovered on other pillars and tablets in South Asia.

It was restored by the Raja Hindu Rao after the Revolt of 1857.

Translation
The inscription on the 3rd century pillar describe King Devanampiya Piyadasi's policies and appeal to the people and future generations of the kingdom in matters of dharma (just, virtuous life), moral precepts and freedoms. Some extracts of the translation, per James Prinsep, are as follows:

Topra Ashokan Edicts Archaeological Park and Museum
In 2015 April, Manohar Lal Khattar, the Chief Minister of Haryana, announced an allocation of INR 50 crore (INR 500 million) to build an Ashokan Edicts Archaeological Park at Topra Kalan village where seven Ashoka Pillars, eight Rock Edicts and other ancient structures of Mauryan Time will be constructed. It was all started back in 2011 when Sidhartha Gauri and Dr. Satyadeep Neil Gauri, Founders of The Buddhist Forum initiated the project of Topra Asoka Edicts Park along with INTACH, Gram Panchayat, Topra Kalan and other social organizations. Village panchayat has given away 28 acres land for the construction of park, museum and monastery.

See also

 Bodh Stupa
 Buddhist pilgrimage sites in Haryana
 Buddhist pilgrimage sites
 Buddhist pilgrimage sites in India

References 

Villages in Yamunanagar district
Haryana
History of Haryana
Indian inscriptions
Early Buddhist texts
Tourist attractions in Haryana
Landscape design history
Buddhist pilgrimage sites in India
Buddhist sites in India